Johann Baptist Strauss may refer to: 

 Johann Strauss I (1804–1849),  Austrian Romantic composer
 Johann Strauss II (1825–1899), his son, Austrian composer of light music